Hyparpax aurora, the pink prominent, is a moth in the family Notodontidae found in eastern North America. The species is listed as being of special concern in the US state of Connecticut. The species was described by James Edward Smith in 1797.

The wingspan is 30–36 mm. Adults have a distinct pink and yellow colouration.

The larval host plants are in the genera Quercus and Viburnum.

References

Moths of North America
Notodontidae
Moths described in 1797